The 1952 All-Ireland Minor Hurling Championship was the 22nd staging of the All-Ireland Minor Hurling Championship since its establishment by the Gaelic Athletic Association in 1928.

Cork entered the championship as the defending champions, however, they were beaten by Tipperary in the Munster semi-final.

On 7 September 1952 Tipperary won the championship following a 9-9 to 2-6 defeat of Dublin in the All-Ireland final. This was their seventh All-Ireland title and their first in three championship seasons.

Results

All-Ireland Minor Hurling Championship

Semi-final

Final

External links
 All-Ireland Minor Hurling Championship: Roll Of Honour

Minor
All-Ireland Minor Hurling Championship